Luossavaara (Northern Sami: Luossavárri) is a mountain in Kiruna, Sweden.  It is the site of a now-inactive iron ore mine formerly operated by the Swedish mining company LKAB.  Today it has a ski lift and slope, as well as a hiking path called Midnattsolstigen (the Midnight Sun Trail).

See also
 Kiirunavaara

External links
 Kiruna ski slope – Information from Kiruna community (Swedish)
 Town hill Luossavaara – Information from Kirunawinter (Swedish)

Kiruna
Mountains of Norrbotten County